The 1948 Detroit Lions season was the team's 19th overall season in the league. The team failed to improve on their previous season's output of 3–9, winning only two games. They failed to qualify for the playoffs for the 13th consecutive season. In this season they used scarlet and black uniforms instead of the traditional Honolulu blue and silver. They returned to Honolulu blue and silver the following season.

Schedule

Note: Intra-division opponents are in bold text.

Standings

References

External links
1948 Detroit Lions at Pro Football Reference
1948 Detroit Lions at jt-sw.com

Detroit Lions seasons
Detroit Lions
Detroit Lions